A boot is a medical device worn during treatment and recovery of a variety of foot injuries. Along with orthopedic casts, leg braces, splints and orthotics, it is a form of immobilizing and weight bearing for injuries to the foot area.

Notes 

Medical equipment